Stefan Józef Florenski (17 December 1933 – 23 February 2020) was a Polish football player, who played as a defender for both Górnik Zabrze and Poland. He was born in Gleiwitz, Germany, now Poland.

His career started in a local club Sośnica Gliwice, and in 1956 he moved to Górnik Zabrze, one of strongest teams in Poland. In Górnik, he was nine times champion of Poland as well as five times winner of the Cup of Poland. Regarded as one of the best defenders in the country, he was an expert on slide tackles.

Florenski played in 11 games for the national team. His debut took place on 29 September 1957 versus Bulgaria and the last game was the 1968 match against Ireland. He was also part of Poland's squad at the 1960 Summer Olympics, but he did not play in any matches.

References

External links
 

1933 births
2020 deaths
Polish footballers
Poland international footballers
Sportspeople from Gliwice
Górnik Zabrze players
Olympic footballers of Poland
Footballers at the 1960 Summer Olympics
Association football defenders
GKS Tychy players